James Maxwell, 1st Earl of Dirletoun (died 1650) was a Scottish courtier and landowner, and Black Rod. He was involved in selling royal jewels.

James VI and I
Maxwell was the son of Robert Maxwell of Kirkhouse (d. 1583) and Nichola[s] Murray, daughter of Charles Murray of Cockpool. His mother was a sister of John Murray of the bedchamber who became Earl of Annandale.

Maxwell was made an usher daily waiter in the household of King James in 1603. A younger brother, Robert Maxwell (d. 1627) was a sergeant-at-arms. On 15 June 1610, King James rewarded the usher with lands in Dumfries. Another Scottish servant, Matthew Hairstanes, received a similar grant on the same day.

Maxwell was appointed Black Rod in 1620 on the death of Sir Richard Coningsby in February 1620. The Black Rod officiated at the annual feast of the Order of the Garter at Windsor Castle and Maxwell was given a house there, and in 1629 he was made Keeper of the little park at Windsor.

In May 1609 James VI and I wrote to his advocate in Edinburgh Thomas Haddington to favour the lawsuit of Sir Robert Douglas and Maxwell against the Lord Herries.

James Maxwell injured the ear of barrister James (or Edward) Hawley at a masque or reception for the Duke of Bouillon at court in May 1612, when he dragged Hawley from a room by his ear string.  This became a more serious affair after Hawley threatened to fight a duel, and his lawyer friends at the Inns of Court took his side, only resolved by the intervention of the king. There was adverse feeling in London against the Scots in the court of King James which this incident reflected, and subsequently there was discussion in 1620 if a Scot could be Black Rod, and Maxwell found it difficult to be naturalized as a denizen of England until 1622.

King James sent him to Heidelberg with presents for Elizabeth Stuart, Queen of Bohemia in May 1614.

In 1616 the Privy Council of Scotland enforced the eviction of several people from Maxwell's lands in Dumfries and Galloway.

In July 1622 Thomas Erskine, Earl of Kellie recommended him to the Earl of Mar writing that he was probably more useful to Mar than his kinsman John Murray, 1st Earl of Annandale. Previously Kellie had written how Maxwell had tried to get King Charles to read a letter from Mar, and would encourage Archibald Primrose to further Mar's business with the king.

Charles I
In 1625 he became a groom of the bedchamber to King Charles. As a gentleman in the king's household he was able to access the king and gain patronage for others. He acquired estates in England including, Wanborough Manor, Guildford Priory House, and Kidland Manor, and obtained patents for iron-making and pipe-clay.

In March 1630 Maxwell, by now wealthy, was involved in the sale of older crown jewels with Francis Cottington and acquired a number of pieces himself including the two pearls remaining from the Mirror of Great Britain and Anne of Denmark's gold circlet set with diamonds, emeralds, rubies and pearls, which had been made for her coronation in England by Spilman and Herrick. There was also a head attire with nine great round pearls.

Maxwell acquired Innerwick Castle, and was known as "Maxwell of Innerwick". He bought the lordship of Dirleton and Dirleton Castle in 1631, and was made Earl of Dirletoun around 1646, though as in the case his courtier of William Murray, Earl of Dysart and Patrick Maule, Earl of Panmure, the process of granting and confirming these peerages is obscure.

James Maxwell died at Holyrood Palace in April 1650, and was buried at Dirleton Kirk.

Family
In 1619 Maxwell married Elizabeth de Boussy, or Bousson de Podolsko (d. 1659), from Antwerp, who had been Anne of Denmark's laundry woman and was the widow of William Ryder (d. 1617), a harbinger or clerk of the royal stables. She owned a miniature portrait of Anna of Denmark's brother, the Duke of Holstein, set with diamonds. The Royalist agent Jane Whorwood was her daughter from her marriage to Ryder.

Their daughter Diana Maxwell married Charles Cecil, Viscount Cranborne, and Elizabeth Maxwell married the Duke of Hamilton.

Robert Maxwell, his brother, died in 1627 leaving an embroidered scarf and £50 for a gown to his niece Elizabeth, and a pair of embroidered slippers and £50 to Diana. Another brother, Charles, may have been the Charles Maxwell killed by Sir Robert Ker in a duel at Cambridge in 1620.

References

Year of birth unknown
1650 deaths
16th-century Scottish people
17th-century Scottish people
Court of James VI and I
Gentlemen Ushers
Peers of Scotland created by Charles I